Crosby  is a village and civil parish in the Hambleton district of the county of North Yorkshire, England. The population of the parish was estimated at 20 in 2010. The population remained at less than 100 at the 2011 Census. Details are included in the civil parish of Thornton-le-Beans.

References 

Villages in North Yorkshire
Civil parishes in North Yorkshire